The 1897–98 season was the fifth season in which Dundee competed at a Scottish national level, playing in Division One and finishing in 7th place. Dundee would also compete in the Scottish Cup, where they would reach the semi-finals.

Scottish Division One 

Statistics provided by Dee Archive

Having finished level on points with Partick Thistle, Dundee played them in a play-off match to determine ranking positions.

League table

Scottish Cup 

Statistics provided by Dee Archive

Player Statistics 
Statistics provided by Dee Archive

|}

See also 

 List of Dundee F.C. seasons

References 

 

Dundee F.C. seasons
Dundee